Martina Capurro Taborda (born 4 December 1997) is an Argentine tennis player.

She has a career-high singles ranking by the Women's Tennis Association (WTA) of 488, achieved on 23 May 2022. She also has a career-high WTA doubles ranking of 701, reached on 10 April 2017.

Capurro Taborda made her WTA Tour main-draw debut at the 2016 Brasil Tennis Cup, where she entered the tournament by a lucky loser spot, after losing in the final qualifying round.

ITF Circuit finals

Singles: 4 (2 titles, 2 runner–ups)

Doubles: 6 (4 titles, 2 runner–ups)

Notes

External links
 
 

1997 births
Living people
Argentine female tennis players
21st-century Argentine women